California Dreams was a publishing label used by Logical Design Works between 1987 and 1991. All of its games were developed by its Polish in-house studio P.Z.Karen whose job was to create Polish designed games aimed at American market. It contributed to the development of computer games in the late 1980s with titles such as Blockout, Street Rod, and Street Rod 2.

Games developed

References

External links 

Defunct video game companies of Poland
Video game companies established in 1987
Video game companies disestablished in 1991
1991 disestablishments in Poland
Polish companies established in 1987